The 19th-century philosopher Friedrich Nietzsche is known as a critic of Judeo-Christian morality and religions in general. One of the arguments he raised against the truthfulness of these doctrines is that they are based upon the concept of free will, which, in his opinion, does not exist.

Schopenhauer
In The Gay Science, Nietzsche praises Arthur Schopenhauer's "immortal doctrines of the intellectuality of intuition, the apriority of the law of causality, (...) and the non-freedom of the will," which have not been assimilated enough by the disciples. Following is, then, the short description of those views of the latter philosopher.

The principle of causality
In Fourfold Root of the Principle of Sufficient Reason Schopenhauer claimed to prove – in accordance with Kant and against Hume – that causality is present in the perceivable reality as its principle, i.e. it precedes and enables human perception (so called apriority of the principle of causality), and thus it is not just an observation of something likely, statistically frequent, which however does not happen "on principle" (empiricism of the principle of causality). More on this dispute in philosophy can be found in the article on free will.

Physical freedom
In his treatise On the Freedom of the Will, Schopenhauer calls the fact that we can do whatever we will a physical freedom, i.e. lack of physically present obstacles, which is not identical with moral freedom. Physically "free" means: one acting according only to one's will; if attempts are made to use this term to the will itself, the question arises: "is will itself willed?," "do you will the will to become so-and-so?". It is therefore a specific aspect of the claim of freedom, in which it is stressed whether the course of consciousness follows indeed in a willed way. The problem of willing the will appears in Thus spake Zarathustra, for instance in the chapter "Backworldsmen."

Necessity vs. contingency
In On the Freedom of the Will, Schopenhauer demonstrates the (well known in philosophy) distinction between necessity and contingency. He calls "necessary" what follows from a given sufficient basis (i.e. that what is already certain – if one knows that the sufficient cause is present). On the other hand, one calls "contingent" or "incidental" (with regard to a sufficient basis) that what does not follow from the latter (so e.g. two unconnected events can be contingent to each other: like when a black cat crosses the street and one's job is lost on the same day). As moral freedom means lack of necessity, it would mean a lack of any basis: it "would have to be defined as absolutely contingent", i.e. an absolute fortuity, or chance.

The question about the freedom of will is thus the question whether something depends on another thing (a state, an event), i.e. is in some way determined by it, or does not depend on anything (then we call it a chance). Or, in other words, whether something can be predicted: whether it is certain (given the presence or absence of the sufficient cause) or not. Cf. Luther's argument: for him everything is a necessity because the Creator knows it already.

Nietzsche's analysis

Power of will
In Beyond Good and Evil Nietzsche criticizes the concept of free will both negatively and positively. He calls it a folly resulting from extravagant pride of man; and calls the idea a crass stupidity. The latter probably relates to ordinary-man's visions about a god who (after the elapse of eternal waiting) creates the world and then waits and observes (being, however, still "beyond time"): and then he is surprised and subdued by what one does. (This vision is brought up by Nietzsche in The Antichrist.)

Next, he argues that free will generally represents an error of causa sui:

Finally, he suggests that the only real thing about will is whether it is strong (i.e. hard to break) or weak:

Nothing is (or can be) fully resistant to stimula, for that would mean it is immutable: whereas nothing in this world is or can be immutable. He therefore continues here the Schopenhauer's issue of physical freedom: "whether you will, what you willed to will".

Will is generally considered a mental power. "Freedom" of will could then be interpreted as: power of will (cf. the appropriate passus from The Antichrist, where Nietzsche generally opposes will-based psychology). Will has power over actions, over many things; therefore, things are determined by will. But is this power unlimited? Does will rule without itself being ruled? (And further: does a Christian want to sin?) – Nietzsche disagrees. A godless man becomes pious out of "grace", he did not want it; and likewise a pious man becomes godless with no merit or guilt. Nietzsche suggests in many places that if a pious man loses faith, it is because of the power of his values over him, of the will for truthfulness...

"Me", will, and chance
Will is something that determines human acts, thoughts etc.  It is will what makes man reluctant to toss a coin for something (cf. The Antichrist about Christians: "in point of fact, they simply do what they cannot help doing"). The problem is, whether it is itself ruled? And here two terms which complicate the picture appear: the term "me" and "chance" (i.e. something independent from anything, beyond control).

The term "me" (as in the statements "it's up to me", "it is you who willed that") had already been recognized as empty in the preface of Beyond Good and Evil (or as connected with the superstition about the soul). Later Nietzsche stated more clearly that it was a tautology ("what will I do? what will my decision be?" – "it's up to you" – that actually means: your decision depends on your decision, something happens in your mind and not somewhere else...). See e.g. On the Genealogy of Morals:

The same however can be applied to the moral weakness of a Christian (his lack of resistance), who would certainly prefer not to sin and would construct himself otherwise if he could. "And many a one can command himself, but still sorely lacketh self-obedience!" – Nietzsche criticizes the idea of "free choice", and even of "choice" in general (cf. the end of above quotation): man does not want to "choose", man wants to affirm himself ("will to power").

Another problem is the role of chance. Unless the change brought to man is too big, a chance is generally responded by will, wherever there is will. He calls it "the redemption (of chance)". This topic dawns as early as in Human, All Too Human, and it returns in many places of Zarathustra. For instance in part 3 it is discussed as follows:

I am Zarathustra the godless! I cook every chance in my pot. And only when it hath been quite cooked do I welcome it as my food.
And verily, many a chance came imperiously unto me: but still more imperiously did my Will speak unto it (...)

Earlier in this part:

The time is now past when accidents [Zufälle] could befall me; and what could not fall to my lot which would not already be mine own!"

To cut it short, if it was always that "we choose a chance", then there would be determinism (for "we", "we ourselves" means: our will and its filtering and determining capabilities). And since it happens otherwise ("a chance chooses us"), then there is indeterminism. But the latter case means we have no will in a topic, i.e. it is at that time morally indifferent to us, adiaphora, not opposed to anything (and therefore even more there is no guilt).

Necessity in man. What is "unfree will"?
Since free will is discussed, it must obviously be some restricted reality (if "freedom" meant "everything," there would be no need for a separate word). What follows? That there must be events external to one's freedom: therefore, besides "free will" there should also consequently be "unfree will." Although Nietzsche considers both terms entirely fictional, he gives some clues about the psychological reality behind them:

In short, an unexpected change. Now, going back to the mentioned definition, chance means: that what cannot be predicted. If randomness affects a man (unsubjugated, reaching even the surface of his consciousness), then "unfree will" occurs. Thus, whenever we call something free, we feel something free, in short: wherever we feel our power, it is deterministic, it is a necessity. And indeed Nietzsche says it with the mouth of Zarathustra:

Out into distant futures, which no dream hath yet seen, into warmer souths than ever sculptor conceived, — where gods in their dancing are ashamed of all clothes: (...)
Where all time seemed to me a blessed mockery of moments, where necessity was freedom itself, which played happily with the goad of freedom: —

The same in Beyond Good and Evil:

The universe indeterministic?
Yet in another part of Zarathustra Nietzsche claims that when we look long-term enough and from the bird's-eye perspective of supreme powers big enough, a chance is unimportant, because it is subject to and step-by-step softened and arranged by natural laws and necessities which constitute the order of the world and evolution:

To Nietzsche everything in this world is an expression of will to power. To exist is to represent will to power, to cause influence (compare similar views of Protagoras' disciples in Plato's Theaetetus). One can cause influence only on something that exists. Therefore, (through induction) an act changes everything from that moment onwards. If one thing was otherwise, everything would have to be otherwise (and generally also backwards). Contrary to Chesterton's views, this general rule is not precluded even by absolute chances: they of course change the course of the world too, but still: if one thing was set otherwise, everything would have to be otherwise.

Several scholars have argued that Nietzsche was not a determinist in his views of the universe. In Zarathustra, absolute randomness (maybe not as the essence of reality, but as a part thereof) can be thought of, yes, perhaps it even exists:

Issues of responsibility and morality
Because causa sui is according to Nietzsche a nonsense, even to a chance could get a basis attributed (only "the whole" has no basis), and it would be "divine dice" (or "Divine Plan"):

If ever I have played dice with the gods at the divine table of the earth, so that the earth quaked and ruptured, and snorted forth fire-streams: –
– For a divine table is the earth, and trembling with new active dictums and dice-casts of the gods: (...)

To Nietzsche no one is responsible either for the necessities (laws and powers) he represents, or for chances he encounters (which conquer him unwillingly – and which, as things totally independent from anything, only the "supreme being" could change); after all, no one is absolutely and completely resistant, there can always happen something which changes one deeply enough.

From The Dawn of Day:

In Twilight of the Idols Nietzsche discusses fatalism and responsibility in these words:

Free will as a psychological error
Nietzsche's critique of free will has essentially two aspects: one is philosophical (fatalistic), and the other is psychological. Fatalism lets Nietzsche theoretically prove the error of moral doctrines, which – most generally speaking – would require that a sinner changed his destiny (for instance by changing the laws of nature, influencing chances which lie completely beyond the extent of his influence), which is by definition impossible. But such theory would not be convincing enough if at the same time the impression of control was not removed, as well as the ever renewed attempts at associating it with the "freedom of will" and building a philosophy out of that. Thus a psychological critique is needed.

If one agrees that the "freedom of will" denotes the power of will which rules but is not itself ruled, then it would at bottom be enough to prove that it is not will what governs human behaviour in order to abolish the very term, to prove that "it is not there". And Nietzsche went on to this. For Nietzsche the term "will" is psychologically strictly connected with the term "aim" (he often combines the two), maybe even they are identical to him. Aim could then be interpreted, according to a common definition, as planning and intellectual foreseeing (of especially effects); according to Nietzsche first and foremost the anticipation of acts which in fact do not need to follow by its virtue from aiming (which is here foreseeing).

In Twilight of the Idols Nietzsche demonstrates the error of false causality just before the error of free will:

and then, in the section directly regarding free will, he observes:

Similarly in The Antichrist: "the will no longer «acts,» or «moves»...", "the term no longer denotes any power". This non-deriving of acts straight way out of aims, which are just foreseeing (the accompanying self-consciousness of that what is to come), but searching for their sources elsewhere (for example in reflexes, habits, urges) is to Nietzsche even one of major differences between medieval (Thomist) and modern psychology.

Nietzsche's words turned out to be prophetic, for modern neuroscience, especially the famous Libet's (or Kornhuber's) experiment and other of this type, has not once confirmed that the decision for an act is made beyond the (self)consciousness (in popular words, the will), which comes up to even half a second later.

About man and freedom
In The Antichrist Nietzsche argues that man should be considered no otherwise than as a machine. Even if some generic chaos (randomness) is added to the picture, it does not affect this. A chance is innocent. He points out the weakness of human as well as of God. Man wills the good, "God" wills the good, and yet evil happens. So where is this "freedom" (i.e. power) of will? And where is this good God?

About good and evil
These two human valuations refer to things essentially mixed with each other and interdependent. Good causes the evil, and evil causes the good. The dichotomy between a good God and an evil satan is a "dualistic fiction."

In Twilight of the Idols (see the quote above) and later in The Antichrist all concepts which explain life as a test or raise an (externally reasonable) moral "task," "purpose" or the "will of God" are considered false. They are a part of the "error of free will" consisting in incomprehension of fatalism of life, i.e. the fact that it is shaped by higher forces.

About organized religion
Religion is a form of controlling people: one man-machine wants to achieve power over another. Even the term "freedom," very often used by theologians, in its positive sense actually means "power." Religion is by no means more "fulfilling the will of God" than anything else. As God is primary and almighty, his will is by definition always fulfilled (it is impossible that he wills something and it is not fulfilled).

A priest, a moralist does in fact nothing for man's "salvation," but just rules, and even when doing so he acts in a way that would (apart from that) be considered immoral.

Nietzsche goes on to analysing the Bible philologically and to guesses about the person of Jesus. He claims that it was not the aim of the latter to have anybody serve him, for God rules everything anyway; to the contrary, in Nietzsche's opinion Jesus fought with churchedness and the notion of sin rooted in the Old Testament. And thus in The Antichrist Christianity was portrayed as the corruption of the original doctrine taught by Jesus about equal rights of all to be children of God, the doctrine of no guilt and of no gulf between God and man.

The very "freedom of will" was invented by the priests in order to master the process of human thinking – and nothing more. And in order to master it, they had first to denaturize it.

About death of God and nihilism
The downfall of Christian values is not an effect – as it has been presented hitherto – of human free will. The supreme values (especially formerly common in European culture) overthrow each other themselves due to inner contradictions and non-matching the nature.

Final views 
In The Will to Power, posthumously assembled from his final notebooks of 1888 and 1889, Nietzsche heavily criticises "determinism and teleology", writing: "If a quantity of force determines and conducts itself in a certain way in every particular case, it does not prove that it has 'no free will'". Later in the work he can be found divorcing himself from both sides of the usual debate on free will:

See also
Jacques the Fatalist
Problem of evil
Force majeure
Free will
On the Freedom of the Will
Chance and Necessity

References

External links
On the Freedom of The Will – first chapter of Schopenhauer's essay

Free will
Philosophy of Friedrich Nietzsche